The 2004 Elections for the Pennsylvania House of Representatives were held on November 2, 2004, with all districts being contested. Necessary primary elections were held on April 27, 2004. Necessary primary elections were held on May 21, 2002. The term of office for those elected in 2004 ran from January 4, 2005 through November 2006. State Representatives are elected for two-year terms, with the entire House of Representatives up for a vote every two years.

Make-Up of the House

Special elections
A special election for the 99th legislative district was held on March 18, 2003, following the December 2002 death of Leroy M. Zimmerman. Republican Gordon Denlinger easily defeated Democrat Bernadette C. Johnson to keep the seat in Republican hands.

A special election for the 168th legislative district was held on June 17, 2003, following the March 2003 death of Matthew J. Ryan. Republican Tom Killion easily defeated Democrat William A. Thomas to keep the seat in Republican hands.

A special election for the 44th legislative district was held on June 17, 2003, following the election of John Pippy to the Pennsylvania Senate. Republican Mark Mustio defeated Democrat Frederich Liechti to keep the seat in Republican hands.

A special election for the 3rd legislative district was held on July 22, 2003, following the May 2003 death of Karl Boyes. Republican Matthew W. Good easily defeated Democrat Brian C. McGrath to take the seat.

A special election for the 109th legislative district was held on January 27, 2004, following the election of John Gordner to the Pennsylvania Senate. Republican David R. Millard defeated Democrat Paul Reichart to keep the seat in Republican hands.

A special election for the 152nd legislative district was held on March 9, 2004, following the January 2004 death of Roy Cornell. Republican Susan Cornell easily defeated Democrat Ross Schriftmann to keep the seat in Republican hands.

Primary election
In the primary election held on April 27, 2004, only one incumbent legislator was defeated for their party's nomination. In the 190th legislative district Democrat Michael Horsey was defeated by Thomas W. Blackwell.

Retirements
Five seats left open by Republican retirements were kept by Republicans, with Jeff Pyle succeeding Jeff Coleman, Kathy Rapp succeeding Jim Lynch, Mark Keller succeeding Allan Egolf, Tom Quigley succeeding Mary Ann Dailey, and Glen Grell succeeding Pat Vance. Democrat Susan Laughlin was succeeded by fellow Democrat Sean M. Ramaley.

The seat vacated by the retirement of Democrat Guy Travaglio was won by Republican Brian L. Ellis. The seat occupied by Jeffrey Coy was filled by Republican Rob Kauffman. Republican Ellen Bard's seat was taken by Democrat Josh Shapiro when she left her seat to run for Congress.

4th legislative district
In the 4th legislative district, incumbent Democrat Tom Scrimenti was defeated by Republican Curt Sonney.

148th legislative district
In the 148th legislative district, incumbent Republican Melissa Murphy Weber was defeated by Democrat Mike Gerber.

General election

References
 
 
 

2004 Pennsylvania elections
2004
Pennsylvania House